Gold Gulch was the largest funfair concession built for visitors at the California Pacific International Exposition, a World's Fair that was open from 1935 to 1936, in San Diego, Southern California, United States. Gold Gulch was a section celebrating the California Gold Rush and the American Old West.

Description
Gold Gulch, located within the World's Fairgrounds in Balboa Park, was a  Old West mining town-ghost town re-creation for fairgoers to experience the atmosphere of a mining boomtown. Gold Gulch was described in the Exposition Guide Book as "a moviefied" version of riproaring '49 days.

Gold Gulch occupied the canyon between the 'Casa de Balboa' and 'Pepper Grove,' southeast of the Spreckels Organ Pavilion. It was composed of a dance hall and a music hall,  rustic unpainted shacks, a brick bank with iron-barred windows, a "Chinese restaurant and laundry," and a Hanging tree with 'dummy' hanging. Barkers lured visitors to a "shooting gallery" where a visiting "sharpshooter" hitting the bull's eye put all the lights out in the Gulch. An "Indian Village" was nearby, with trading posts and events.

Gold Gulch charged no admission, but its shops and attractions did. "One could have coffee in a tin cup, beer 'by the scupper,' badges and rings made from horseshoe nails by the blacksmith, and have a photograph taken with fake beard, six shooter gun prop, a ten gallon cowboy hat on a mine-pack burro."

Designer
Gold Gulch was designed, directed and produced by Harry Oliver, a renowned and Oscar-nominated Hollywood Movie set designer, humorist, and Western writer.

Legacy
The popularity and aesthetic accomplishments of Gold Gulch inspired and influenced subsequent Western theme parks and their "frontier village" attractions. Examples include the Calico Ghost Town restoration and the "Ghost Town" section of Knott's Berry Farm by Walter Knott, and Frontierland by Walt Disney.

See also
Ghost town
List of ghost towns in Arizona
List of ghost towns in California
List of ghost towns in Colorado
List of ghost towns in Nevada
Gold prospecting
Gold Rush
Black Hills Gold Rush
California Gold Rush
Women in the California Gold Rush
List of people associated with the California Gold Rush
Comstock Lode
Fairbanks Gold Rush
Georgia Gold Rush
Holcomb Valley gold rush
Pike's Peak Gold Rush

References

Book list
"History of San Diego County" - Carl H. Heilbron, ed. - San Diego, 1936.
"History of San Diego"  - by William E. Smythe - online book 're-issue'

External links
Journal of San Diego History: "San Diego Invites the World to Balboa Park a Second Time"
California Pacific International Exposition: vintage photographs
San Diego Union newspaper -  San Diego Union: archives website

Western (genre) theme parks
History of the American West
Balboa Park (San Diego)
History of San Diego
World's fair architecture in California
1935 in the United States
1936 in the United States
California Gold Rush